Fin rot is a symptom of disease or the actual disease in fish. This is a disease which is most often observed in aquaria and aquaculture, but can also occur in natural populations.

Fin rot can be the result of a bacterial infection (Pseudomonas fluorescens, which causes a ragged rotting of the fin), or as a fungal infection (which rots the fin more evenly and is more likely to produce a white "edge"). Sometimes, both types of infection are seen together. Infection is commonly brought on by bad water conditions, injury, poor diet, stress, or as a secondary infection in a fish which is already stressed by other disease.

Fin rot starts at the edge of the fins, and destroys more and more tissue until it reaches the fin base. If it does reach the fin base, the fish will never be able to regenerate the lost tissue. At this point, the disease may begin to attack the fish's body; this is called advanced fin and body rot.

Fin rot is common in bettas due to poor water conditions in pet stores.

Symptoms
 Fin edges turn black / brown
 Fins fray
 Base of fins inflamed
 Entire fin may rot away or fall off in large chunks
 Fins have white dots (if these are seen on the body it is possibly a symptom of Ichthyophthirius multifiliis)

Treatment
 Change the water and check the filter
 Treat with a suitable treatment such as phenoxyethanol, malachite green methylene blue or other proprietary agent (most seem to prefer aquarium salt; however, it is important to make sure the product is for freshwater, not saltwater, fish). 
 Find out the pH and correct it if necessary.
 Use antibiotics if the rotting is jagged.
 Use antifungal medication if the rot is more evenly spread out and the fin has holes. This may also be a symptom of an external columnaris infection, especially if it progresses rapidly (within 24 hours) and the rotted edge has a white, fuzzy appearance.
 Water temperature should be changed to 24–26 °C.

Prevention 
Fin rot can be prevented with good water quality, feeding fresh food in small portions and maintaining constant water temperature. Keeping the tank from becoming cluttered (for domestic fish) will also help prevent fin rot.

References

External links
Diagnosis, prevention and treatment information at the Aquarium Wiki

Fish diseases